Lichen spinulosus  is a rare skin disorder characterized by follicular keratotic papules that are grouped into large patches.  It is a variant of keratosis pilaris named for its resemblance to a patch of lichen.

See also 
 Hook nail
 List of cutaneous conditions

Notes

References

External links
 Derm Net NZ
 Emedicine
 Thehinhso

Conditions of the skin appendages